The 2015–16 UAE Pro League (also known as Arabian Gulf League for sponsorship reasons) was the 41st top-level football season in the United Arab Emirates. Fourteen teams participated with Al-Ain as the defending champions after securing the championship last season for the twelfth time. Al-Ahli won its 7th title on 29 April despite being held to a 2-2 draw at home.

Teams

Stadia and locations

League table

Statistics

Top scorers

Source: Soccerway

Assists

Source: Soccerway

Fair Play Ranking

References

UAE Pro League seasons
1
UAE